Daria Colonna (born May 12, 1989) is a Canadian poet from Montreal, Quebec. She is a two-time Governor General's Literary Award nominee for French-language poetry, receiving nods at the 2018 Governor General's Awards for Ne faites pas honte à votre siècle and at the 2021 Governor General's Awards for La Voleuse.

References

21st-century Canadian poets
21st-century Canadian women writers
Canadian women poets
Canadian poets in French
Writers from Montreal
Living people
1989 births